2008 FAM League is the 57th edition season of current third-tier league competition in Malaysia. The league is called TM Malaysia FAM League for sponsorship reason.

The league winner for 2008 season is PBDKT T-Team.

Teams

The following teams participated in the Malaysia FAM Cup 2008. In order by the number given by FAM:-

  PBDKT T-Team
  SDMS Kepala Batas
  MP Muar FC 
  MBJB FC 
  KSK Tambun Tulang FC
  KSB Juara Ban Hoe Leong FC
  Melodi Jaya Sports Club
  Kor RAMD FC

Team summaries

Stadia

League table

References

3
2009